A postage stamp design error is a mistake made during the design phase of the postage stamp production process. Design errors most commonly occur as minor mistakes, such as a missing letter in the binomial name of an organism depicted on the stamp, but some have been major gaffes, such as a map appearing to lay claim to another country's territory, or the depiction of the wrong person on the stamp.

A design error caught during the production process may disappear quietly, with copies of the error only getting into the public's hands via unscrupulous employees (these are therefore not considered "real" stamps). Design errors are often caught during the distribution process, when large numbers of postal workers are scrutinizing the new stamp; although officials may elect to withdraw all the stamps at that point, it is very difficult to retrieve every one of them, and in these instances a few may end up being sold and used. The exact circumstance are important, because once the stamp is sold to a customer, whether or not against the postal service's rules, it is considered to be legitimate.

The Legends of the West sheet was a particularly difficult case. Shortly before the release of this commemorative series (and after sheets had already been sent to post offices and found their way into collectors' hands), a claim was made that the image of Bill Pickett used for his stamp's painting was actually an image of his brother Ben. The United States Postal Service decided to recall the stamps and re-issue them later with Pickett's stamp based on an image known with certainty to be him. The USPS sold the entire run of erroneous stamps at face value by lottery.

Somewhat rarer is a design error that is first noticed by a member of the public. This usually happens within a few days of the stamp first going on sale, and usually ends up as the subject of newspaper articles. A recent example of this is the Maya Angelou stamp issued by the U.S. Postal Service on April 7, 2015.  The stamp contains a quotation that had been frequently attributed to Ms. Angelou, but was really written by Joan Walsh Anglund.  In this circumstance, the Postal Service was unaware of the real author until it was brought to their attention by The Washington Post.

The response of postal officials may include withdrawal of all the stamps, or simply the suspension of printing and distribution, pending revision and reprinting.  If the stamps are withdrawn, then the ones already out there become instant rarities, as happened with the PRC's "All China is Red" stamp of 1968. The withdrawn stamps may be destroyed or overprinted if the design can be repaired that way.

Design errors occurring during chaotic times such as revolutions will simply become a topic of discussion for future philatelists. Similarly for errors occurring in highly technical aspects, such as the spelling of a scientific name of a plant or animal, and may not be noticed during the stamp's period of use.

Some notable design errors 
Pagsanjan Falls stamp, Philippines 1932
Franz Schubert/Robert Schumann error, East Germany 1956
Gronchi Rosa, Italy 1961
The Whole Country is Red, China 1968
Legends of the West, United States 1993
Queen Elizabeth II error, Malta 2008
Predator Free 2050, New Zealand 2018 

The largest run of an error on a postage stamp is the 2011 United States 'Statue of Liberty Forever stamp'. The stamp shows the replica of the Statue of Liberty in Las Vegas rather than the original in New York. The stamp was released in December 2010 and the error was not noticed until March 2011 when it was identified by Sunipix, a stock photo agency in Texas. Ten and a half billion of the error stamps were produced.

Postage stamp design error types 
Design errors are different from any other types of errors including typographical errors, incorrect watermarks, overprints, paper types, perforation, and gums. There are the following types of design errors:

 Errors in the plot
 Incompatible features:
 errors in chronological compatibility
 errors in the depiction of natural phenomena
 errors in the depiction of technological processes
 Invalid features:
 errors associated with the ownership of territories
 mistakes in state and religious symbols
 errors related to personalities
 Errors in inscriptions or overprints (in numbers, names, concepts)
 Typos, clerical, spelling, punctuation mistakes
 Semantic, factual errors

See also
Errors, freaks, and oddities

Bibliography 
 Jean-Pierre Mangin, Guide mondial des timbres erronés. Errors on stamps, ed. Yvert, Amiens ; book 1, 1999,  ; book 2, 2005. Bilingual books (English and French).
 D.E.G. Irvine and M. Seshold, Errors in Postage Stamp Design Published by National Philatelic Society, 1979, 
 More than 3.000 crazy errors on stamps

References

Philatelic terminology
Error